The William R. Smith House, at 920 Marietta St. in Zanesville, Ohio, was built in 1894.  It was listed on the National Register of Historic Places in 1982. It has been demolished.

References

National Register of Historic Places in Muskingum County, Ohio
Houses completed in 1894